Jordan Lenac is an Australian rugby union player for Glasgow Warriors in the United Rugby Championship. Lenac's primary position is scrum-half. Lenac also represented the Ayrshire Bulls in the Scottish Super 6 competition and most recently represented AEIS Agronomia Rugby in the Campeonato Português de Rugby competition in Portugal.

Rugby Union career

Professional career

In 2017 he played for the inaugural Under 20 Queensland Reds Super Rugby side.

Lenac moved to Scotland in December 2020, joining Glasgow Warriors on a training contract. He made his Glasgow Warriors debut in the re-arranged Round 11 match against  on 27 March 2021, coming on as a replacement. He was a late replacement in the match for Sean Kennedy. He became Glasgow Warrior No. 326.

In 2021 Lenac played for Ayrshire Bulls in the Scottish Fosroc Super 6 competition where he was part of the championship winning team in that year.

In 2022 Lenac joined AEIS Agronomia rugby based in Portugal playing in the national Portuguese competition

International career

He has previously played for Australian Schoolboys.

References

Living people
Glasgow Warriors players
Rugby union scrum-halves
1997 births